George Pither (24 June 1899 – 3 January 1966) was an English professional footballer who played as an outside forward in the Football League, most notably for New Brighton and Crewe Alexandra.

Career statistics

References

External links
 LFC History profile

1899 births
1966 deaths
English footballers
Association football outside forwards
Brentford F.C. players
Millwall F.C. players
Bristol Rovers F.C. players
Torquay United F.C. players
Merthyr Town F.C. players
Liverpool F.C. players
Crewe Alexandra F.C. players
New Brighton A.F.C. players
Tunbridge Wells F.C. players
Chatham Town F.C. players
Margate F.C. players
English Football League players
Southern Football League players

People from Kew, London